Blue & Lonesome can refer to:

 "Blue and Lonesome" (song), a song by Little Walter.
 Blue & Lonesome (George Jones album), 1964
 Blue & Lonesome (The Rolling Stones album), 2016